Saulius Binevičius (born 23 January 1979 in Kaunas, Lithuanian SSR, USSR) is a 3-time Olympic freestyle swimmer from Lithuania. He swam for Lithuania at the 2000, 2004 and 2008 Olympics.

References

External links
 
 
 
 

1979 births
Living people
Lithuanian male freestyle swimmers
Olympic swimmers of Lithuania
Swimmers at the 2000 Summer Olympics
Swimmers at the 2004 Summer Olympics
Swimmers at the 2008 Summer Olympics